This is a list of programs broadcast by 2×2, whether they aired in the past, are currently aired, or are scheduled to air in the future.

Animated series

12 oz. Mouse
6Teen
Aaagh! It's the Mr. Hell Show!
Action Man
Adventure Time
Aeon Flux
Allen Gregory
Aikatsu!
Amazing Nurse Nanako
The Amazing World of Gumball
American Dad!
Angel's Friends
Angelic Layer
Angry Beavers
Animals (American TV series)
Animaniacs
Apollo Gauntlet
Aqua Teen Hunger Force
Aquarion
Archer
Armitage III
Attack on Titan
Avatar: The Last Airbender
The Avengers: United They Stand
Axe Cop
Baby Blues
Baby Looney Tunes
Back at the Barnyard
Baki the Grappler
Baldr Force EXE Resolution
Ballmastrz 9009
Basilisk
Batman: The Animated Series
Batman Beyond
Batman: The Brave and the Bold
Beavis and Butt-head
Beetlejuice
Berserk
Biker Mice from Mars
Black Blood Brothers
Black Butler
Black Lagoon
Blassreiter
Blazing Teens
Bleach
Blood+
Bob and Margaret
Bobs Burgers
Bojack Horseman
Bolts and Blip
The Boondocks
Brad Neely's Harg Nallin' Sclopio Peepio
The Brak Show
Breadwinners
Bravest Warriors
Brickleberry
Bro'Town
Bromwell High
Britt Allcroft's Magic Adventures of MumfieBurn-Up ScrambleCamp LazloCaptain Scarlet and the MysteronsCaptain StarCelebrity DeathmatchChowderChrono CrusadeClaranceClass Of 3000Cleveland ShowClone HighClose EnoughCodename Kids Next DoorConan the AdventurerCosmic CowboysCourage The Cowardly DogCow and ChickenCowboy BebopCoyote Ragtime ShowCramp TwinsCrapston VillasCrash CanyonCreature ComfortsThe CriticCyboarsD.N.AngelDan vsDaphne in the Brilliant BlueDariaDating GuyDeath NoteDennis the Menace and GnasherDesert PunkDevil May Cry: The Animated SeriesDexter's LaboratoryDiebusterDinofrozDilbertDowntownDr. Katz, Professional TherapistDragon BallDragon Ball GTDragon Ball ZDragon Ball SuperDragon HuntersDrawn TogetherThe Drinky Crow ShowDuckmanDucktalesEd, Edd n EddyEek! The CatEl-Hazard: The WanderersElfen LiedErgo ProxyExchange Student ZeroFamily GuyFanboy & Chum ChumFantastic FourFantastic Four: The Animated SeriesFather of the PrideFatherhoodFLCLFinal SpaceThe FlintstonesThe Flintstone Comedy ShowFreak ShowFred's HeadFrisky DingoFugget About ItFull Metal Panic!Full Metal Panic? FumoffuFull Metal Panic: The Second RaidFullmetal AlchemistFuturamaFuture-WormGalactik FootballGankutsuou: The Count of Monte CristoGargoylesGary and His DemonsGary the RatGenerator RexGerry Anderson's New Captain ScarletGhost HoundGhost in the Shell: Stand Alone ComplexGilgameshGlenn Martin, DDSGood VibesThe Goode FamilyGreat Teacher OnizukaGrenadierGrendizerThe Grim Adventures of Billy & MandyGun x SwordGungraveGunslinger GirlGurren LagannHaibane RenmeiThe HakkendenHappy Tree Friends (Removed From 2x2 Productions)Harvey Birdman, Attorney at LawHe-Man and the Masters of the UniverseThe HeadHellsingHey JoelHi Hi Puffy AmiYumi High School GirlsHome MoviesHot Streets (TV series)House of RockHuntik: Secrets & SeekersI Am WeaselIkki TousenImmigrantsThe Incredible HulkInvader ZimIria: Zeiram the AnimationIron ManIron Man: Armored AdventuresJeff & Some AliensJet GrooveThe JetsonsJinki: ExtendJoe 90John Callahan's Quads!Johnny BravoJohnny TestJonny QuestJustice League (TV series)Justice League UnlimitedKaBlam!Kaput and ZöskyKarasKarate KommandosKevin SpencerKing Arthur's DisastersKing of the HillKing Star KingKirby: Right Back at Ya!Kishin CorpsKung Fu Panda: Legends of AwesomenessLast ExileLazor WulfLeague of Super EvilThe Legend of KorraThe Life & Times of TimLife's a ZooLegends of Chamberlain HeightsLittlest Pet ShopLoonatics UnleashedThe Looney Tunes ShowThe Loud HouseLost UniverseLucy, the Daughter of the DevilMacross PlusMADMaXiMankatsuMarvel KnightsThe Marvel Super HeroesThe Marvelous Misadventures of FlapjackMary Shelley's FrankenholeThe MaskThe Melancholy Of Haruhi SuzumiyaMetalocalypseMinoriteamMission HillMnemosyneModern TossMongo Wrestling AllianceMonkey DustMonsters vs. AliensMonsunoMoonbeam CityMoral OrelMr. BeanMr. PicklesMy Gym Partner's a MonkeyMy Life As A Teenage RobotMy Little Pony: Equestria Girls (2017 television specials)My Little Pony: Friendship Is MagicNapoleon DynamiteNarutoNaruto: Shippuden (ended until 318 episodes)Neighbors from HellNeon Genesis EvangelionThe New Adventures of BatmanThe New Adventures of Speed RacerThe New Adventures of SupermanThe New Batman AdventuresNew Fist of the North StarNinja Scroll: The SeriesNinjago: Masters of SpinjitzuThe NutshackThe OblongsOdd Job JackO'GradyOne PieceOOgliesOut TherePanty & Stocking with GarterbeltParanoia AgentParasite DollsThe Penguins of MadagascarThe Problem SolverzPerfect Hair ForeverPickle and PeanutPippi LongstockingPig Goat Banana CricketPinky and the BrainPokémonPokémon: Black & WhitePond LifePopetownThe Powerpuff GirlsThe Powerpuff Girls (2016)PriParaProject Blue Earth SOSPretty RhythmPuppy in My Pocket: Adventures in PocketvilleQumi-QumiRabbids Invasion (Dub only on 2x2)Ragnarok the AnimationRead or DieThe Real GhostbustersRegular ShowThe Ren & Stimpy ShowRen & Stimpy "Adult Party Cartoon"Revolutionary Girl UtenaRex the RuntRick and MortyRicky Gervais ShowRicky Sprocket Showbiz BoyThe Ripping FriendsRoboroachRobot ChickenRobotechRocket MonkeysRocko's Modern LifeRuby GloomRugratsRWBYSailor MoonSaladin: The Animated SeriesSamurai 7Samurai ChamplooSamurai JackSanjay and CraigScooby-Doo, Where Are You?Sealab 2020Sealab 2021The Secret ShowSeth MacFarlane's Cavalcade of Cartoon ComedyShaggy & Scooby-Doo Get a Clue!She-Ra: Princess of PowerSheep in the Big CityThe Shivering TruthSilver SurferThe SimpsonsSit Down, Shut UpSheZowSidekickSkunk Fu!SkylandSlacker CatsSon of ZornSonic XSoul MusicSouth ParkSpace Ghost Coast to CoastSpaceballsStatic ShockSpawnSpectacular Spider-ManSpeed GrapherSpeed RacerSpice and WolfSpicy CitySpider-ManSpider-Man and His Amazing FriendsSpider-Man UnlimitedSpider-WomanSplicedSpongeBob SquarePantsSquidbilliesStargate InfinityStar Trek: The Animated SeriesStar Wars: The Clone Wars (2008)Station ZeroStorm HawksStressed EricStripperellaStroker and HoopSuper FriendsSuperman: The Animated SeriesSuperjail!SupermansionTaz-ManiaTeenage Mutant Ninja Turtles (1987)Teenage Mutant Ninja Turtles (2003)Teenage Mutant Ninja Turtles (2012)Tenkai KnightsThe Three Friends and JerryThe Little PrinceThunderCats (1987)ThunderCats (2011)The TickThunderbirds Are Go
Tiny Toon Adventures
Titan Maximum
Tokyo Ghoul
Tokyo Majin
Tom & Jerry Kids
Tom and Jerry Show
Tom and Jerry Tales
Tom Goes to the Mayor
Total Drama Action
Total Drama Island
Total Drama: Revenge of the Island
Total Drama World Tour
Two More Eggs
The Trap Door
Trigun
Trinity Blood
Tripping the Rift
TripTank
The Twelve Kingdoms
Ugly Americans
Undergrads
Uncle Grandpa
Unsupervised
Vandread
The Venture Bros.
VH1 ILL-ustrated
Voltron
Wallace and Gromit's World of Invention
Watch My Chops
We Bare Bears
What It's Like Being Alone
Winx Club
Witchblade
Wolverine and the X-Men
The Wrong Coast
Wyrd Sisters
X-DuckX
X-Men
Xcalibur
Xiaolin Showdown
Yam Roll
YOLO: Crystal Fantasy
Young Justice
Yu-Gi-Oh!
Yu-Gi-Oh! Duel Monsters
Zombie Hotel

Original productions
Atomic Forest
Cliptomaniacs (live-action)
Enter Ice Cream
Game Cops (live-action)
Hobosti 2X2 (live-action)
2X2 Music 
Immortal Movie (live-action)
Kit Stupid Show
Pykhchevo
Reutov TV (live-action)
Reutov TV Discovers Russia (live-action)
School 13: Game Vault
SuperOleg (live-action)
Valera
Suspicious Owl

Short series
This is a list of short animated series, which aired or airs on 2x2.

The Adventures Of Jeffrey! (Removed From 2x2 Productions)
Angry Kid
Bernard
Bricks 'N Brats
Bugged
Friday Wear (fr)Futz!I Am Baby CakesThe ImpLamarinatorLascarsLenore, the Cute Little Dead GirlLooney TunesMerrie MelodiesMinusculeMolangMr. FreemanMuzzy Comes BackMuzzy in GondolandOscar's OasisPib and PogPopeye the SailorThe Professor BrothersPuccaRobinShaman's QuestShaun the SheepSuckersA Town Called PanicTom and JerryWishfartWallace and GromitY'All So StupidYam Roll (segments)''

The channel also broadcasts various animated shorts by the studios Soyuzmultfilm and Pilot.

References

External links
Official list of series

2x2